Gerald Scully (1920-1999)  was an Australian rugby league footballer who played in the 1930s and 1940s.  Scully played in the NSWRFL premiership for North Sydney and Newtown as a lock.

Playing career
Scully began his first grade career in 1939 aged 18 with Norths and played in the 1943 NSWRL grand final defeat against Newtown in front of a crowd of 60,922 which was a record attendance for a grand final at the time.

In 1947, Scully played one season with Newtown and his final game in first grade was the semi final defeat against Canterbury.

Gerald Scully was an Australian serviceman during World War Two, serving as a Gunner in the 54 Australian Composite Anti-Aircraft Regiment.

References

1920 births
1999 deaths
Australian rugby league players
North Sydney Bears players
Newtown Jets players
Rugby league locks
Rugby league players from Sydney
Australian Army personnel of World War II
Australian Army soldiers